Sarah Browne is a contemporary Irish artist who works in public art, performance, sculpture, and collaboration.

Work 
The Arts Council of Ireland describes her as "an artist whose practice is concerned with non-verbal, bodily experiences of knowledge and justice." Browne's "research-based practice investigates the materiality of knowledge, attending to the intersection of invisible structures of power with bodily experience".

Career 

Browne has worked for many years collaboratively with Gareth Kennedy under the name Kennedy Browne. The duo exhibited together, and separately, at the Irish Pavilion at the 53rd Venice Biennale in 2009. Browne "commissioned a hand-knotted carpet from Donegal Carpets" and "as Kennedy Browne they’ve made a video work in which volunteers, situated in the iconic setting of Liberty Hall, narrate a text taken from Milton Friedman’s commentary on the virtues of the free market." They also exhibited 3 films as the Redaction Trilogy at the Hugh Lane, 2019–20. Kennedy Brown has work in the collection of the Irish Arts Council.

She also collaborated with Irish artist Jesse Jones for a project responding to the Repeal the 8th campaign, titled In the Shadow of the State.

In 2019 Browne created the public art commission, Public Feeling, for South Dublin County. "Sarah Browne’s Public Feeling explores the health impacts of austerity on the individual and collective body, the politics of “resilience”, and considers the gym or leisure centre as a space where the bodies of citizens are trained, transformed and cared for." Browne was included in the Limerick City Gallery of Art exhibition Irish Women Artists since 1984 and curated the TULCA Festival of Visual Arts, Galway in 2020.

Browne currently teaches sculpture at NCAD, Dublin.

Bibliography 
 Kennedy Browne and Michael Dempsey (Eds). The Redaction Trilogy, The Hugh Lane Gallery, Dublin, 2019.
 Luigi Fassi, Katerina Gregos, Steirischer Herbst (Ed.) Liquid Assets: In the Aftermath of the Transformation of Capital, Mousse Publishing, Milan, 2013.
 The Myth of the Many in the One, artist publication, cottagelab, 2013. 
 Katarzyna Kosmala, 'Imagining Masculinities: Spatial and Temporal Representation and Visual Culture' in Routledge Advances in Feminist Studies and Intersectionality, Routledge, 2013. 
 Glenn Harper & Twylene Moyer (Ed.) Artists Reclaim the Commons: New Works / New Territories / New Publics (Perspectives on Contemporary Sculpture), ISC Press, 2013. 
 Kennedy Browne: IrelandVenice, monograph produced as part of the 53rd Venice Biennale, The Dock, 2009. 
 How Capital Moves, artist publication, cottagelab, 2011.
 Browne, Sarah, et al. How to use fool's gold. Dublin: Project Press, 2011. 
 Daniel Birnbaum (Ed.), ‘Making Worlds/Fare Mondi’, official catalogue for the 53rd Biennale Di Venezia, Marsilio, 2009. 
 SPACE SHUTTLE. Six Projects of Urban Creativity and Social Interaction, PS², Belfast, 2007. 
 EV+A give(a)way, Gandon Editions, Cork, 2004.

References

External links 

 Artists' website
 Kennedy Browne site

Irish contemporary artists
Living people
Year of birth uncertain
Irish women artists
21st-century Irish women artists
Year of birth missing (living people)